Oliver Perry-Smith (October 11, 1884 in Philadelphia – May 13, 1969) was an American rock climber, mountaineer and skier who moved to Dresden in 1902 to attend a technical university.

Climbs in Saxon Switzerland 
He became well known in the Sächsische Schweiz for the first ascents of major sandstone rock towers such as:
Schrammtorwächter (VI) in 1905
Kanzelturm (VI) in 1905
Teufelsturm (VIIb) in 1906 (at 5.8+ - with a shoulder stand - a very difficult rock climb)

and first ascents of several climbing routes that are still very popular today, e. g.:

Spannagelturm Perrykante VIIb in 1906
Falkenstein Südriss (VIIa) in 1913
Daxenstein Klavier (VIIa) in 1913
Daxenstein Perryriss (VIIb) in 1913
(All grades Saxon rating)

In total "he made more than 90 ascents in Saxon Switzerland, 33 of which
are rated VI or above; there were 32 first ascents, 13 solo climbs and 36
additional ones on which he led".

Alps 
On a trip to the Alps in 1908 he and his friend Rudolf Fehrmann made a number of first ascents.

 The most famous is the "Fehrmann Corner" (in German, Fehrmannverschneidung), V-, on Campanile Basso, SW face  (also known as "Guglia di Brenta", in Brenta group in Dolomites, on August 28). Despite its name, this route was led by Perry-Smith (because, as explained in biographical article in AAJ 1964, "Fehrmann was the first to sign the summit book and later he was assumed by later climbers to be a leader").
 One of others of their new routes is the north face of Cima Piccola di Lavaredo (in German: Kleine Zinne), Aug 15.

In the Alps "his repeated ascents include also Weisshorn, Matterhorn, Dent Blanche, Zinalrothorn, Wellenkuppe, Obergabelhorn, Kleine Zinne".

Skiing 
Beside his achievements in climbing, he also won the Austrian championship in cross-country-skiing and ski-jumping in 1914.

Other aspects 
There are a number of anecdotes depicting Perry-Smith as a rather unusual character:

When people doubted his ascent of 'Perryriss', he climbed that route again and wrote in big letters 'Perry' on the rock. (it can still be read today)
He owned a Bugatti race car and got in trouble with the police several times for driving fast and hazardously.
He was once arrested for getting drunk and disturbing the peace by threatening people with a pistol in the town of Bad Schandau.

In the year 1914 Oliver Perry-Smith returned to the US, never to visit Saxony again.

See also
 Rudolf Fehrmann

References

Sources
 J. Monroe Thorington, Oliver Perry Smith; Profile of a Mountaineer,  American Alpine Journal (AAJ) 1964, pp. 99–120 (with 14 photographs in additional plates)
 J. Monroe Thorington, In Memoriam: Oliver Perry Smith (1884-1969), AAJ, 1970, pp. 218–219

External links
 pdf version of article by J. M. Thorington, Oliver Perry-Smith..., AAJ, 1964, pp. 99-120 and l Plates 77-90 (Retrieved February 27, 2011)
 pdf version of obituary by J. M. Thorington, Oliver Perry-Smith (1884-1969), AAJ, 1970, pp. 218–219 (Retrieved February 27, 2011)
 Proceedings of the Club: Secretary report for the year 1969, AAJ, 1970, pp. 224–226 (Retrieved February 27, 2011)
 Oliver Perry-Smith illustrated biography in the section The Great Pioneers of Modern Rock Climbing (Retrieved February 27, 2011)

1884 births
1969 deaths
American rock climbers
American mountain climbers
Sportspeople from Philadelphia
Sportspeople from Dresden